Andre Alexander (born April 15, 1967) is a former gridiron football wide receiver who played for the Calgary Stampeders of the Canadian Football League and the New York/New Jersey Knights of the World League of American Football. In 1989, he caught 19 receptions for 311 yards and a two touchdowns across seven games. Andre also holds the San Francisco 100meter record at 10.42 which he set in 1985.

References

External links 
Andre Alexander on Just Sports Stats

1967 births
Living people
American football wide receivers
Canadian football wide receivers
Fresno State Bulldogs football players
Calgary Stampeders players
New York/New Jersey Knights players
Players of American football from San Francisco
Players of Canadian football from San Francisco